All Elite Wrestling (AEW) is an American professional wrestling promotion founded in 2019. AEW personnel consists of professional wrestlers, managers, referees, commentators, ring announcers, coaches, and various other positions. Executives are also listed.

AEW is the sister promotion of Ring of Honor (ROH) and has partnerships with Japanese promotions New Japan Pro-Wrestling (NJPW), CyberFight - encompassing Pro Wrestling Noah (NOAH), DDT Pro-Wrestling (DDT), and Tokyo Joshi Pro Wrestling (TJPW),, and Pro Wrestling Wave, Mexico's Lucha Libre AAA Worldwide (AAA), and United Kingdom based Revolution Pro Wrestling (RevPro). Wrestlers and other personalities from those promotions may also make periodic appearances at AEW events. Championships from sister/partner promotions currently held by AEW wrestlers that have been defended on AEW programming are also noted. 

AEW additionally has a training facility known as the Nightmare Factory, which is owned by AEW wrestler/coach Q. T. Marshall; trainees from the facility may also make appearances at AEW events and on AEW programming.

Khan family
The Khan family are the founders, owners and top executives of AEW.

Roster

Men's division

Women's division

Other on-air personnel

Referees

Broadcast team

Coaches (producers)

Executives

Notes

See also
 List of former All Elite Wrestling personnel

References

External links

AEW Roster

Personnel
 
All Elite Wrestling